Frank Elliott (September 6, 1890 Mirabile, Missouri – March 13, 1959  Seattle, Washington )  was an American racecar driver active in the 1920s. In addition to six appearances in the Indianapolis 500, Elliott also competed on California's wood plank tracks, such as the Beverly Hills Speedway. Frank also raced on the wooden race track at the Kansas City Half Million Dollar Speedway on July 4, 1923.

Indy 500 results

References

1890s births
1957 deaths
Indianapolis 500 drivers
People from Clinton County, Missouri
Racing drivers from Missouri
AAA Championship Car drivers